The 1968 North American Soccer League season was the 56th season of FIFA-sanctioned soccer in the United States and Canada, and the 1st with a national first-division league with the inaugural season of the NASL.

The NASL was formed this year as a merger between the former top division soccer leagues, the United Soccer Association along with the National Professional Soccer League. In the inaugural year, the Atlanta Chiefs were the champions, by winning the NASL Final 3–0, in a two-game aggregate over the San Diego Toros. While the Chiefs were the champions for the season, the premiers for this season were the Toros, who obtained the highest point total.

Overview
17 teams competed in this inaugural season, and the Atlanta Chiefs won the championship. While San Diego won the premiership, Atlanta's winning percentage was higher because a match had been canceled. This would mark the first of five times in the league's history that the best record did not equate to a premiership. The Oakland Clippers had an identical record to the Western Division Champion Toros and a higher goal-differential, but just as with Atlanta the Toros had more league points. Oakland had won every competition in the NPSL's 1967 season, but were denied a chance to defend their title in the merged league because of this unique points system.

8 came from the NPSL: Atlanta, Baltimore, Kansas City (from Chicago), New York,  Oakland, St. Louis, San Diego ( from Los Angeles) and Toronto.
9 came from the USA:  Boston (nickname changed), Chicago, Cleveland, Dallas, Detroit, Houston, Los Angeles, Vancouver (nickname shortened) and Washington.
2 teams from the NPSL folded (Philadelphia and Pittsburgh).
3 teams from the USA folded (New York, San Francisco and Toronto).
2 teams, Houston (USA) and St. Louis (NPSL), had the same nickname the "Stars".

Regular season
W = Wins, L = Losses, T= Ties, GF = Goals For, GA = Goals Against, Pts= point system, Avg Att= Average Attendance

6 points for a win, 
3 points for a tie,
0 points for a loss,
1 point for each goal scored up to three per game.
-Premiers (most points). -Best record. -Other playoff teams.

Eastern Conference

Western Conference

 ^League best, *League worst

NASL All-Stars

Playoffs

Bracket

Conference finals

NASL Final 1968

First leg

Second leg

1968 NASL Champions: Atlanta Chiefs

Post season awards
Most Valuable Player: Janusz Kowalik, Chicago
Coach of the year: Phil Woosnam, Atlanta
Rookie of the year: Kaizer Motaung, Atlanta

References

 
North American Soccer League (1968–1984) seasons
1968 in American soccer leagues
1968 in Canadian soccer